Edith Bonnesen née Andersen (1911–1992) was a Danish civil servant who, under the German occupation of Denmark in World War II, became a member of the Danish resistance. She contributed to the illegal newspaper De frie Danske, worked for the Danish-Swedish Refugee Service and joined the British Special Operations Executive (SOE). Arrested but released on several occasions, she made a dramatic escape from Copenhagen's Gestapo headquarters in August 1944.

Early life
Born in Copenhagen on 28 September 1911, Edith Andersen was the daughter of the senior civil servant Edmund Christian Sofus Andersen (1886–1962) and Carla Vilhelmine Fliedner (1890–1928). She and her sister were brought up in a well-to-do home where they were taught to respect king and country. After completing realskole at Aurehøj Gymnasium in 1928, she trained to become an office worker. From 1930 until her marriage with Poul Winther Bonnesen in 1935, she worked for the London insurance company. Her marriage was dissolved in 1940.

Resistance work
Bonnesen had already experienced the Nazis' racial policy when in 1935 she and her husband helped a Jewish couple in Denmark. In 1937, while visiting Berlin, she experienced first hand the way Jews were being treated. As a result, she became firmly opposed to the Nazis and became interested in participating in illegal activities.

After her divorce in 1940, Bonnesen was employed in the Ministry of Transport's department for monitoring private railways. Here she had access to confidential German reports which she communicated anonymously to her friends in order to protest against the German occupation. In early 1942, a friend brought her in touch with De frie Danske (Free Denmark), a resistance group which published an illegal paper with the same name. In addition to contributing to the paper, she became involved in producing ration cards and false identity documents. Her apartment on Tranegårdsvej in Hellerup was often used as a meeting place for resistance workers or for hiding wanted persons, including Mogens Hammer, the first SOE agent parachuted in Denmark.

In connection with involvement in De frie Danske and the SOE, she was arrested three times by the Danish and German police in late 1942 but was released after denying any involvement in illegal work. After the Germans took over the government of Denmark in August 1943, she had to go underground. She continued her illegal work with the radio specialist L.A. Duus Hansen who transmitted coded information to the SOE. Using the code name Lotte, she became his personal secretary.

In August 1944, while visiting the Danish-Swedish Refugee Service's illegal post office in central Copenhagen, she was arrested and taken to the Gestapo headquarters in the Shell House. While being interrogated, a senior officer came in and ordered her to be taken to the basement as there was sufficient evidence against her. She was in fact taken by a guard to a large room on the second floor. The guard went into a back room where he started talking to another German. Left alone, she decided to try to escape. She walked down the stairs to the first floor where she met two civilian Germans who were leaving the building. She walked behind them and out of the front door where the guard failed to recognize her. After walking calmly across the bridge to the Palace Theatre, she ran off as fast as she could.

Now that she had been identified, she had to leave Denmark for neutral Sweden where she was employed as a secretary at the American consulate in Helsingborg. Unofficially, she operated a radio, receiving messages from Denmark and passing them on to London. After the American consul was called back to the United States at the beginning of 1945, Bonnesen acted as consul until the Liberation. She then returned to Copenhagen where she worked with the Special Forces Mission until the autumn of 1945.

Post-war activity
In 1946, Bonnesen was employed by the textile firm Fiedlers Kattuntryk where she later headed the export department. In 1952, she had to leave as her hearing was seriously impaired as a result of an injury from a shooting incident during the German occupation. After learning to lip-read, she was employed as a secretary and later as an official by the Defence Department until her retirement in 1975.

Edith Bonnesen died in Copenhagen on 20 February 1992.

Awards
She was awarded the King's Medal for Courage in the Cause of Freedom for her participation in the resistance movement.

References

1911 births
1992 deaths
People from Copenhagen
Danish resistance members
Danish civil servants
Recipients of the King's Medal for Courage in the Cause of Freedom